Selvage, or Selvege, may refer to;

Textiles
 Selvage, a "self-finished" edge of a piece of fabric
 Selvage (knitting), the stitch(es) that end each row of knitting
 Selvage denim, shuttle-loom-woven denim

People
 Les Selvage, an American professional basketball player
 Eugene Selvage, the owner of Lucky Lager Brewing Company

See also
Salvage (disambiguation)